"Funktafied" is the name of a 2001 single by British pop group Five Star, peaking at #26 on the U.S. Hot R&B/Hip-Hop Songs singles sales chart in July of that year and becoming their first single from their Eclipse album. The single was a U.S. only release and only available in the UK on import.

The single became the group's biggest American single in twelve years, their previous hit being "Another Weekend", which reached #23 in 1989.

Track list
CD Single:

 Funktafied (Bounce Joint Mix)
 Funktafied (World Mix 2001)
 Funktafied (Yeah, Yeah, Yeah, Bounce Mix 2) 
 Funktafied (Single/Album Version)

References

2001 singles
Five Star songs
Songs written by Doris Pearson
Songs written by Delroy Pearson
2000 songs